Prime Minister's National Relief Fund (PMNRF) in India is the fund raised to provide support for people affected by natural and man made disasters. Natural disasters covered under this include flood, cyclone, earthquake etc. Man made disasters include major accidents, acid attacks, riots etc. The fund is also allotted to the people for treatment like cancer, kidney transplantation, heart surgery etc. The fund was first consolidated during the time of the first prime minister of republic of India Jawaharlal Nehru.

History 
Partition of British India occurred in 1947 along with the formation of two dominions called Pakistan and India. Partition resulted in mass violence and people were moving across borders in all means. Thus to support the displaced people from Pakistan Jawaharlal Nehru created a fund collected from the public in January 1948.

Implementation 
The fund is fully collected from the public and has no budgetary allocation from the government. The fund collected is exempted from income tax to drive more people into the initiative. Chairman of the fund is the Prime Minister and he is assisted by joint secretary. The whole of the fund is deposited with scheduled commercial banks and the beneficiaries are identified directly by the Prime  Minister from among the beneficiaries.

The control of the PMNRF has been with the Prime Ministers Office (PMO) since 1985. PMO holds the complete authority of the fund. The President of Congress is not a member of PMNRF anymore despite assertions made by certain public figures.

Impact 
The fund was used extensively to provide support for victims of Uttarakhand flood 2013, cyclone in Kerala and Lakshadweep, 2014 violence in Assam, Madhya Pradesh explosion 2015, Tamil Nadu floods 2015 etc.

Income and expenditure 
The income and expenditure of the PMNRF for the period 2009-10 to 2018-19 is as follows (in crore rupees):

References  

Government schemes in India